Burnet Hershey (13 December 1896 – 13 December 1971) was a war correspondent and writer of plays, screenplays, and books including accounts based on his experiences during the World War I and World War II eras. His work includes screenplays and an article on the munitions trade that was adapted to film.

He was born in Romania and came to the United States with his parents Josef Hirsh Bertha née Bughici Hirsh in 1899. He went to public schools in New York City and Columbia University School of Journalism. He had a brother Abraham and two sisters, Epvira and Elizabeth.

He reported for the New York Evening Post before and during World War I and for The New York Sun. He also reported abroad during World War II.

He was a member of the Overseas Press Club, The Silurians, and The Lambs.

Columbia University has some of his manuscripts.

Bibliography
The Odyssey of Henry Ford and The Great Peace Ship (1967) based on his experience aboard the ship
"Dealers in Death", about the munitions trade
The Brown Danube, a play about the Nazi takeover of Austria in 1938
 The Bloody Record of Nazi Atrocities (1944)
Trial by Fire (1964)
 From a Reporter's Little Black Book (1967)
You Can't Get to Heaven on a Roller Skate (1969)

Filmography
The News Parade (1928)
Africa Shrieks (1931)
Stars of Yesterday (1931)
The Sea Ghost (1931)
That Goes Double (1932), story
Million Dollar Melody (1933), screenplay
Pleasure Island (1933), co-wrote story with A. Dorian Otvos
Henry the Ache (1933), co-writer
Bubbling Over (film) (1934)	
All American Drawback (1935), story
Speed Devils (film) (1935)
Double Exposure (1936), story
Inside Information (1939 film), based on an unpublished novel he co-wrote

References

1971 deaths
1896 births